1,000 Places to See Before You Die is a 2003
travel book by Patricia Schultz, published by Workman. A revised edition was published in November 2011. The new edition is in color.  An iPad app debuted in December 2011.

Among the "1,000 places" in the book are historic ones such as Robert Louis Stevenson's home in Western Samoa and the trail of the Lewis and Clark Expedition in the United States, cultural ones such as the Oregon Shakespeare Festival in the United States and La Scala in Italy, and natural ones such as the Grand Canyon in the United States and the Dead Sea in Israel. The book blends well-known places with rather unknown ones.

On March 29, 2007, the Travel Channel and Discovery HD Theater premiered a series based on the book's locations, called 1,000 Places to See Before You Die. Patricia Schultz published a follow-up edition in 2007 called 1,000 Places to See in the USA and Canada Before You Die.

Book Summary
The book's chapters are broken down by geographical locations.  Within each chapter, the entries are further narrowed by region.  The chapters are as follows:

Chapter 1: Europe: includes Great Britain and Ireland, Western Europe, Eastern Europe, and Scandinavia.  Entries range from Cambridge University in Cambridgeshire, England to Midsummer Eve in Dalarna, Sweden.
Chapter 2: Africa: includes North Africa, West Africa, East Africa and Southern Africa, and Islands of the Indian Ocean.  Entries for this chapter range from Alexandria, Egypt to Mahé in Seychelles.
Chapter 3: The Middle East: Entries include Acre (also referred to as Akko) in Israel and Yemen's Shibam.
Chapter 4: "Asia: From Beijing's Forbidden City to Xi'an's Terra-Cotta Warriors, Japan's Sapporo Snow Festival to Calcutta's Marble Palace, Turkey's Whirling Dervishes to the Mekong Delta in Vietnam"
Chapter 5: "Australia, New Zealand, and the Pacific Islands: From the Sydney Opera House to Uluru, New Zealand's Tasman Glacier to the Cook Islands' Dance Festival, the Sepik River in Papua New Guinea to Tonga's Heilala Festival"
Chapter 6: "The United States and Canada: From Alaska's Inside Passage to Savannah's Historic District, the Art Institute in Chicago to the French Quarter in New Orleans, the Las Vegas Strip to New York's Finger Lakes Region, Monticello in Virginia to Jackson Hole in Wyoming, Skating the Rideau Canal in Ottawa to Heli-Skiing in British Columbia"
Chapter 7: "Latin America: From the Mayan Ruins of Palenque in Mexico to Belize's Barrier Reef, the San Blas Archipelago of Panama to Buenos Aires' Tango Bars, Chile's Wine Region to the Otavolo Market in Ecuador, Machu Picchu in Peru to the Penguin Rookeries of Antarctica"
Chapter 8: "The Caribbean, Bahamas, and Bermuda: From Cap Juluca in Anguilla to the Shark Rodeo at Walker's Cay in the Bahamas, Cuba's Jazz Festival to Sailing the Grenadines, Old San Juan in Puerto Rico to Saba National Marine Park"

Editions
Patricia Schultz. 1,000 Places to See Before You Die, Updated Edition, Workman 2010. 
Patricia Schultz. 1,000 Places to See Before You Die in the US and Canada, Workman 2007
Patricia Schultz. 1,000 Places to See Before You Die, Workman 2003.

References

External links
Book's official website
Travel Channel series' website

Travel books
2003 non-fiction books
Workman Publishing Company books